The octagonal casemaker moth (Coleophora octagonella) is a moth of the family Coleophoridae. It is found in the United States, including Alabama, Florida, Georgia, North Carolina and Tennessee.

The species is misplaced in the genus Coleophora and the family Coleophoridae. It actually belongs to the family Batrachedridae. The larvae feed on lichens which grow on Quercus trees. They construct a case, but it is constructed rather differently from those of Coleophora species.

References

octagonella
Moths described in 1882
Moths of North America